The Bishop of Cloyne is an episcopal title that takes its name after the small town of Cloyne in County Cork, Republic of Ireland. In the Roman Catholic Church, it is a separate title; but, in the Church of Ireland, it has been united with other bishoprics.

Pre-Reformation bishops
The diocese of Cloyne has its origins in the monastic settlement founded by St Colman in the 6th century. Cloyne was not one of the dioceses established at the Synod of Rathbreasail in 1111, but a bishop of Cloyne was ruling the diocese by 1148, which was recognised at the Synod of Kells in March 1152.

In 1326, Pope John XXII issued a papal bull for the union of the dioceses of Cork and Cloyne to be united on the death of the bishop of either see. But on the death of Philip of Slane, Bishop of Cork in 1327, the two dioceses remained separate. Bishop Payn of Cloyne obtained a confirmation of the union of the two dioceses from Pope Martin V on 21 September 1418. However, the union did not take effect due to opposition by Bishop Milo fitzJohn of Cork. Bishop Payn of Cloyne resigned in 1429 and Jordan Purcell was appointed bishop of the united see of Cork and Cloyne on 15 June 1429.

Post-Reformation bishops

Church of Ireland succession
After the Reformation, the Church of Ireland see of Cork and Cloyne continued until 1583 when they were united with Ross. For a short while they were separated in 1638 into the bishopric of Cork and Ross and the bishopric of Cloyne, but were reunited again in 1660. Cloyne once again became separate bishopric in 1679. Since 1835, Cloyne has been part of the united diocese of Cork, Cloyne and Ross.

Roman Catholic succession
The Roman Catholic Diocese of Cloyne remained united with Cork until 10 December 1747 when Pope Benedict XIV approved their separation. On the same day it was decreed that Cloyne to be united with Ross. Following a recommendation at the Synod of Thurles, Cloyne and Ross were separated on 24 November 1850.

The current bishop of Cloyne is the Most Reverend William Crean, who was appointed by the Holy See on 25 November 2012 and installed on 27 January 2013.

See also

Cloyne Cathedral

References

Lists of Irish bishops and archbishops
Religion in County Cork
Roman Catholic bishops of Cloyne
Bishops of Cork or Cloyne or of Ross
Anglican bishops of Cloyne